Yaksatovo is a rural locality (a selo) and the administrative center of Yaksatovsky Selsoviet, Privolzhsky District, Astrakhan Oblast, Russia. The population was 3,576 as of 2010. There are 80 streets.

Geography 
Yaksatovo is located 31 km southwest of Nachalovo (the district's administrative centre) by road. Karagali is the nearest rural locality.

References 

Rural localities in Privolzhsky District, Astrakhan Oblast